Larry Gene Ashbrook (July 10, 1952 – September 15, 1999) was an American mass murderer who killed seven people and injured a further seven at a post See You at the Pole Rally featuring a concert by the Christian rock group Forty Days, before committing suicide. It occurred at Wedgwood Baptist Church in Fort Worth, Texas, on September 15, 1999.

Shooting 
Ashbrook interrupted a teen prayer rally in the Wedgwood Baptist Church, slamming his hand on a door to make his presence known. Spouting anti-Baptist rhetoric, he opened fire with a 9 mm semi-automatic handgun and a .380-caliber handgun. He reloaded several times during the shooting; three empty magazines were found at the scene. Seven people were killed, four of whom were teenagers (a 14-year-old boy, two 14-year-old girls and a 17-year-old boy). Three people sustained major injuries while four others received relatively minor injuries.

At Ashbrook's home, police found a pipe, end caps to enclose the pipe, gunpowder and a fuse. Ashbrook had thrown a pipe bomb into the church, but it exploded vertically, and did not injure anyone.

During the shooting, Ashbrook was confronted by a 19-year-old former football lineman, Jeremiah "Jeremy" Neitz, who recounted the ensuing conversation for the Houston Press:

Ashbrook fired several more rounds and yelled, "This religion is bullshit." Neitz replied, "Sir, what you need is Jesus Christ in your life." Neitz asked Ashbrook "What about you?" Ashbrook replied, "Fuck off" and "I can't believe you believe in this junk." He then sat down and shot himself. Time magazine described accounts of the confrontation as "unconfirmed" and possibly "pious invention", but the Houston Press wrote that the story had been confirmed, quoting the Fort Worth police detective who had interviewed Neitz: "Maybe he did frustrate Ashbrook with what he was saying. There's no way we'll ever really know. All I can say is that I'm impressed by what he did that evening. It was a very brave thing. You have to admire that."

Victims

Personality and mental state 
Nine years before the shooting, Ashbrook's mother died. This reportedly sent him into a cycle of erratic and frightening behavior. Ashbrook lived for many years with his father, Jack D. Ashbrook. Across the street from the Ashbrooks' home, neighbors said they saw Ashbrook treat his father violently but were afraid to report it. Newspaper editor Stephen Kaye, whom Ashbrook had visited days before the shooting, described him as being "the opposite of someone you'd be concerned about", saying he "couldn't have been any nicer."

However, his neighbors had an entirely different view of him, describing him as strange and violent. Investigators at his house discovered that he had virtually destroyed the interior of his house - holes were bashed into the walls with crowbars, the toilets were filled with concrete, and the fruit trees growing in the front yard had been poisoned.

Police investigating the shooting could find no solid motive for the crime. In the months before the shooting, people who knew Ashbrook said he became increasingly paranoid, certain that he was being framed for serial murder and other crimes that he did not commit. He also feared that the CIA was targeting him, and he reported psychological warfare, assaults by co-workers and being drugged by the police. Just days before the shooting he voiced these concerns to a newspaper, saying "I want someone to tell my story, no one will listen to me; no one will believe me."

According to Houston-area writer John Craig, Ashbrook had ties to the Phineas Priesthood and Christian Identity, both of which view mainstream Christianity as an enemy.

Media
And A Time To Heal: Wedgwood Baptist Church, 2010

See also
Sutherland Springs church shooting
Daingerfield church shooting
Charleston church shooting
List of rampage killers in the United States

References

External links
Wedgwood Baptist Church Shooting - Immediate Aftermath (1999)
Wedgwood Baptist Church Shooting - Community Response (1999)
Wedgwood Baptist Tragedy

Wedgwood Baptist Church Shooting
Death in a Church: The Faith, The New York Times (September 18, 1999)
Death in a Church: The Overview, The New York Times (September 18, 1999)
Death in a Church: The Politics, The New York Times (September 18, 1999)
Death in a Church: The Killer, The New York Times (September 18, 1999)
Death in a Church: The Overview, The New York Times (September 17, 1999)
Death in a Church: The Victims, The New York Times (September 17, 1999)
Church gunman kills 7, self, in Texas, CNN (September 16, 1999)

1952 births
1999 deaths
20th-century American criminals
American mass murderers
Anti-Christian sentiment in the United States
Attacks in the United States in 1999
1999 murders in the United States
Christian Identity
Mass murder in 1999
People from Fort Worth, Texas
Murder–suicides in Texas
Place of birth missing
American murderers of children
Deaths by firearm in Texas
Suicides by firearm in Texas
Improvised explosive device bombings in the United States
Murder in Texas
1999 mass shootings in the United States
1999 suicides
Crimes in Texas
Bombers (people)
Mass shootings in the United States